= Over the Long High Wall =

1972 autobiographical work by J. B. Priestley

Over The Long High Wall
- First edition
- Author: J. B. Priestley
- Language: English
- Genre: Autobiography
- Publisher: Heinemann
- Publication date: 1972
- Publication place: United Kingdom
- Media type: Print

Over The Long High Wall is a 1972 autobiographical work by the British writer J. B. Priestley.

== Bibliography ==
- Klein, Holger. J.B. Priestley's Fiction. Peter Lang, 2002.
